Persakis is a surname. Notable people with the surname include:

Ioannis Persakis (1877–1943), Greek athlete who competed at the 1896 Summer Olympics
Petros Persakis (1879–1952), Greek gymnast who competed at the 1896 Summer Olympics